Bonnyman may refer to the following:

People
Alexander Bonnyman, Jr. (1910 – 1943), United States Marine Corps officer
Jack Bonnyman (b. 1920), Australian rugby league footballer
Phil Bonnyman (b. 1954), Scottish association football (soccer) player

Places
Bonnyman, Kentucky, an unincorporated community and coal town in Perry County, Kentucky, United States.